The yellowtail rasbora (Rasbora tornieri) is a species of freshwater ray-finned fish in the genus Rasbora from mainland south-east Asia.

References

Rasboras
Taxa named by Ernst Ahl
Fish described in 1922